Hamdan International Photography Award (HIPA) is an international photography award, founded in 2011 under the patronage of the crown prince of Dubai, Sheikh Hamdan bin Mohammed bin Rashid Al Maktoum.

The annual total prize money is $400,000 US dollars (up from $389,000 in 2013). The award is open to anyone. In its first year (2011/2012), 5600 photographers were involved from 99 countries; in its second year (2012/2013), 19,000 thousand people from 121 countries were involved.

Award Seasons

Winners

References

External links
 
Ceremony 2014
Press conference Gujarat Photo Video Trade Fair

Photography awards
International awards
Awards established in 2011